Khuiratta or Khoi ratta is a Tehsil in Kotli District, in Pakistan-administered Azad Kashmir.

Location
Khuiratta lies 29 km southeast of Kotli and 154 km from Islamabad, to the east. Khuiratta is approximately 7 kilometres from the Line Of Control (LOC). It is the second largest town of District Kotli after Kotli City. It has an elevation of 2570 feet above sea-level. Khuiratta is situated on the western side of Rajouri (IHK), with Tehsile Charhoi to the west, Rajouri to the east, Noshehra (IHK) to the south, Tehsile Nakyal to the north east and Kotli to the north west.

Khuiratta is connected to Kotli and Nakyal by a circular road and to Mirpur (80 km) with two links, one via Dhongi-Charhoi and the other via Darghoti-Charhoi. 
Khuiratta is also connected to Chirri, Seri, Battal, Ghaian and Khor Gumbi Bhera (via Manjwal and Dheri Sahibzadian), Khuiratta used to be connected to Rajouri in Indian-administered Kashmir via Seri but this road is now closed at the point Janjoot Bhadar and is separated by the Line of Control.

Tourism
Khuiratta and its surrounding areas are very popular among tourists. At approximately a distance of 15 kilometres from Khuiratta city is a Kills Karjai, very Beautiful and attractive 
A place for the tourists going through  a beautiful village called Ropri, Kot Bhattian, (10 Kilometers from Khuiratta roads are neat and clean) Ghaiyi, Samryali Hill, kotla Kandyal, also visiting Points, 4 kilometres from khuiratta.
shrine of "Mai Totti Sahiba" also known as Darbar Mai Toti. Another known shrine of Baba Ali Lashkar is located at Dheri Sahibzadian. Both the locations are visited by hundreds of people daily. Late Sardar Aziz Ahmed started the construction of one of the biggest hospitals of Azad Kashmir in Khuiratta nowadays The Name of Hospital "Aziz Felfer Hospital".
Khuiratta is known for the annual Basakhi (Mela Maveshian). Thousands of people from the Kotli, Charhi, Mirpur, Broatgalla, Nidi Sohana and other adjoining districts and Pakistan attends the festival in spring to watch sports, animal parades and horticultural displays. For many years this mela was being held in Sihoor Bella Cricket Stadium. This mela lasts for three days; activities include, Neza bazi, Bazu giri, bull racing, wrestling, football and other form of traditional entertainment.

Khuiratta is in an area with a number of natural springs and waterfalls. Several springs emerge from the mountains at Bahees Naraha (Bahee Narrah means 22 natural water springs). In ancient times this was an important Hindu place of worship. Close to KhuiRatta are the Bagh Fatehpur Dehari and Bagh Sain Hazuri. Thousands of people come to the Mai-ka-Makam Shrine (Mai Toti Sahiba), some 4 km from Khui Ratta city, to pay homage to Mai Toti Sahiba.

Tourism is restricted to locals or inhabitants of Pakistan. In order for foreigners to visit, they have to obtain a No Objection Certificate (NOC) which if granted is only valid for 4 days. The whole of the Azad Kashmir area is similarly restricted by the armed forces of Pakistan and entrance to the area is marked by signs stating "Foreigners Not Allowed". Before the cease-fire agreement between Pakistan and India, there were military and civilian casualties.

Health
There is dearth of specialized health care services in the urban community of Khuiratta. However, general medical care services are being provided through Aziz Welfare Trust Hospital, four hospitals (Younis Medical Centre, Mehrban Hospital, Ishaq Hospital, Shifa Hospital) in private sector and RAHMA Health Centre (NGO). Tehsil Heqaquarter Hospital is the only hospital in public sector. However, the gap of specialized health care services availability has been abridged by weekly visits of consultants of various specialties in different hospitals. The population of peripheral areas of Khuiratta city is deprived of even basic health facilities. 

The Aziz Welfare Trust Hospital is a huge modern building located in the heart of the city. Birmingham UK based Sardar Abdul Aziz (Late) in the year 2003 goal was to provide healthcare to the poor by building a hospital. The objectives to provide specialised health care services to local communities and especially to the underprivileged population of the area. 

Besides, General Outdoor medical services, Aziz Welfare Hospital is providing Dialysis, Dental, Laboratory, and Radio Diagnostics, Maternal and Child Health and emergency services to roughly 150 patients daily on subsidized rates to all and free to the poor.

Ambulance services are available at Aziz Welfare Hospital, THQH, Younis Medical Centre and Rehma Hospital but other emergency services like Fire brigade, Blood Bank, 1122 are not available in the area. Qureshi Medical Store is the only facility in Khuiratta you can buy variety of medicines.

Villages and community
There are several villages and towns situated in Khuiratta which are Ropri,Kot Bhattian, Chattar, Seri'broatgalla, Khore, Karjai, Bindian, Gahyain, Plana, Dhanna, Brahi, Battal, Chirri, Sammlar, Brute, Bhayyal, Manjwal, Sehoore, Dharra, fateh pur Dehari, Bandli, Ghoara, Roshan-Abad(Andah).
The best scenario for visitors are Karjai Fort, Battal Brahi, Planna, Kot-Bhattian, Darghoti and Kot.
Darkalla is in a valley known as Wadi e Banah.
Smaller villages located in Khuiratta have mosques. They are also home to shrines of some religious scholars like Mian Imam Baksh of Hujra near Tokahn.  There is also a shrine of Baba Ali Lashkar of Dheri Sahibzadian and Pir Haider Shah of Dehari Bagh and Sheikh Alai Jee at khuiratta. There is also a shrine of Mai toti  known as darbar mai toti sahiba.
There is also a shrine of baba ghoray shah badshah. There is also a shrine of Rahaman Baba. There is also a shrine of Meeraan Aashiq ali Badshah. There is also a shrine of Sain Sadiq.

Geography
Khuiratta has mountainous terrain and is situated very close to the Line Of Control (LOC), only 8 km away, the temporary border between Indian-administered Kashmir and Azad Kashmir. It has some notable small towns and villages namely, Dehari Baagh, Damandah, Bindian, Gurah, Gitran, Hujra, Merah, Biyal, Manjwaal, Gheyaien, Karjai, Samryali, Hill village, Kotla, Bna Hill, Broat Gala, Anderla Kotehra, Phalni, Seri, Manjwar, Bandli, Saidpur, Darkala, Bain Thalla, Sehore, Phehan, Hill Mughalan, Banni Bannah, Khore bhera, Dhaana, Roshan Abad (formerly Andha), Gohra, pathan mohrha, Barooth, Katasery, Chirri, Battal, Barie, Samlaar, Plaana, Darbar Mai Toti, taeen, Darkoti, darkoti bala, maraal, Dharaa, khore kalla chamber, Nidi Sohana. Khore Rachalla, Khore Graan, Morah Bakhshiyan, Ruknabad, Sarootiyan, Gangal, Gajiyari, Bandali, Mohajar Colony, Hilla Ghair and chakranda. Khuiratta is connected with Kotli via through three ways firstly via Dongi secondly via battal-Dhanna Road and Thirdly via nakyal.
 
Few years back Aziz welfare trust constructed a huge hospital, which was considered to be a mega project. However, the Hospital could not get into its 2nd phase due to death of Mr. Abdul Aziz (Chairman of Aziz Welfare Trust) therefore it is just a building. These days an International level community health center (RAHMA Basic Health Center) is providing basic health & lab facilities to needy and poor people in the area of Khuiratta and surroundings. This hospital is the great achievement of Mr. Muhammad Saghir Qamar (Chairman RAHMA Islamic Relief, Pakistan) and gift from friends of Norway, which is providing free medical consultation, medicine and lab facilities to poor people of khuiratta.

Khuiratta is connected to Kotli on one side, Nakyal on west LOC on east and on south is Charoi.

Khuiratta is connected to the main road to Jammu.

Needi Sohana is the union council of Khuiratta and the highest point of the Kotli district and the Khui Forest is located in this union council this fores see on google earth.

Education
Khuiratta has two Govt. degree colleges for both boys and girls and four private colleges. There are also two high school for both boys and girls and some English medium schools, of which notable are BA Queens School & College, Pasban Science School & College, The Holy Public School & College, Stars Academy, Pasban School, Suffa Academy & Science College, National science college, Pakland School, Ideal Public School, Allama Iqbal Public School & College, Unique Reformer Public School and Stars Academy. One of the earliest and only government school is the "Government High School Khuiratta". Army Public School is an addition and contribution of Pak Army in uplifting the standard of education in Khuiratta Azad Kashmir.

Notable pirs and faqirs include Mai Toti Sahiba, Baba Ali Lashkar Sahib, Sangan Darbar, Sain Rukan Deen Sahib, Sain Sakhi Sahib, Chamby Wali Darbar (hujra sharif).

Politics
In July 2022 Dr. Nisar Ansar Abdali Elected as MLA of Kashmir Assembly and Minister of Health Department.

History
Before the independence of Pakistan and India in 1947, it was used as a trade corridor between Rajouri and Mirpur.

References

Populated places in Kotli District
Tehsils of Kotli District